Alessandro Rampini (6 June 1896 – 2 October 1995) was an Italian footballer who played as a forward. On 13 May 1920, he represented the Italy national football team on the occasion of a friendly match against the Netherlands in a 1–1 home draw. His brother Carlo Rampini was also a footballer for Pro Vercelli.

Honours

Player
Pro Vercelli
Italian Football Championship: 1920–21, 1921–22

References

1896 births
1995 deaths
Italian footballers
Italy international footballers
Association football forwards
F.C. Pro Vercelli 1892 players